Bubaque is one of the Bijagós Islands in Guinea-Bissau, and is also the name of its main town.  The island has a population of 6,427, the town Bubaque 4,299 (2009 census). The area of the island is 75 km2, it is 13.6 km long and 8 km wide.

The island is known for its wildlife and is heavily forested. It is also where the Unesco nature reserve headquarters is situated, as well as a museum.

Transportation 
Bubaque airport serves the island. A weekly ferry runs to Bissau from Bubaque's port. All transportation on the island itself is done by motorbike or on foot.

Notable people
Stefanie Gercke (b. 1941), German-South African writer
Juvêncio Gomes (b. 1944), fighter for the PAIGC and later mayor of Bissau

References

External links
 Scientific research on youths on the islands of Bubaque by Lorenzo I. Bordonaro

Bolama Region
Populated places in Guinea-Bissau
Bissagos Islands
Sectors of Guinea-Bissau